Elisabeth Ostermeyer (born 2 April 1929) is a German former gymnast. She competed in seven events at the 1952 Summer Olympics.

References

External links
  

1929 births
Possibly living people
German female artistic gymnasts
Olympic gymnasts of Germany
Gymnasts at the 1952 Summer Olympics
Sportspeople from Nuremberg